In Mao Zedong's original formulation of the military strategy of people's war, a revolutionary base area ( gémìng gēnjùdì), or simply base area, is a local stronghold that the revolutionary force conducting the people's war should attempt to establish, starting from a remote area with mountainous or forested terrain in which its enemy is weak.

This kind of base helps the revolutionary conducting force to exploit the few advantages that a small revolutionary movement has—broad-based popular support, especially in a localized area, can be one of them—against a state power with a large and well-equipped army. To overcome a lack of supplies, revolutionaries in a base area may storm isolated outposts or other vulnerable supply caches controlled by the forces of an opponent.

See also
 Jiangxi–Fujian Soviet
 Red corridor
 On Protracted War
 Ho Chi Minh trail
 Shaan-Gan-Ning Border Region
 Jin-Cha-Ji Border Region

References

External links
 Mao Zedong: The Establishment of Base Areas
 Communist Party of Peru: Line of construction of the three instruments of the revolution
 Kishanji: To establish a liberated area
 Museum of Revolutionary Base, Henan province
 .

Guerrilla warfare
Ideology of the Chinese Communist Party
Maoism
Maoist terminology
Military strategy
Revolution terminology
Second Sino-Japanese War